Edward Southwell Jr. (16 June 1705 – 16 March 1755) of King's Weston, Gloucestershire,  was an Anglo-Irish Whig politician who sat in the Parliament of Ireland from 1727 to 1755 and in the British House of Commons  from 1739 to 1754.

Southwell was the son of Edward Southwell (1671–1730) and Elizabeth Cromwell, 8th Baroness Cromwell and the grandson of Sir Robert Southwell. He was educated at Westminster School from 1715 to 1716 and matriculated at Queen's College, Oxford in 1721. He travelled abroad from 1723.

Southwell sat in the Irish House of Commons for Downpatrick from 1727 until his death. He succeeded his father as Principal Secretary of State (Ireland) in 1730, and on 6 May 1732 he was appointed to the Privy Council of Ireland.

Southwell married on 21 August 1729, to Lady Katherine Watson (died April 1765), daughter of Edward Watson, Viscount Sondes and Lady Katherine ( Tufton), and lived in Kings Weston House near Bristol. Their son, Edward, later became Baron de Clifford.

Edward Southwell Jr. sat in the House of Commons of Great Britain from 1739 to 1754 as MP for Bristol.

Personal papers
Papers relating to Edward Southwell are held by Bristol Archives (Ref. 44785 and 45317/2/5/1) (online catalogue page 1, online catalogue page 2). A travel journal, dating from 1725 to 1726, is held in the British Library Manuscripts Collections. Other records relating to Edward Southwell are held at Bristol Reference Library.

References

1705 births
1755 deaths
Members of the Parliament of Ireland (pre-1801) for County Down constituencies
Members of the Privy Council of Ireland
Irish MPs 1727–1760
Members of the Parliament of Great Britain for English constituencies
British MPs 1734–1741
British MPs 1741–1747
British MPs 1747–1754
People from Gloucestershire (before 1904)